Lambda Theta Alpha Latin Sorority, Inc. is a Latina-based sorority, established in 1975 at Kean University by seventeen women of Latin, Caribbean, and European descent as a support system for women in higher education. According to their website, Lambda Theta Alpha states that its focus would be to "actively integrate itself into the social, political and community service arena that other students had been involved with."

The sorority was a member of the National Association of Latino Fraternal Organizations, and won recognition as Sorority of the Year from 2000–2001, 2002–2003, 2003–2004, 2009–2010, 2011–2012, 2012–2013 and 2013– 2014.

History
Seventeen women came together to form the sorority and are recognized as the 17 Founding Mothers. According to the Sorority's website, Lambda Theta Alpha is recognized as the first Latina sorority in the United States. Lambda Theta Alpha partakes in traditions such as having hand signs and calls, as well as saluting and strolling; but not stepping, out of respect to the "Divine Nine" or the National Pan-Hellenic Council. Symbolically, saluting demonstrates unity and respect, while strolling demonstrates unity and pride.

Founding Mothers

National philanthropy

St. Jude Children’s Research Hospital  
Lambda Theta Alpha members serve thousands of hours each year to a variety of philanthropic causes and needs. In the effort to create a more united and bigger impact nationally, Lambda Theta Alpha selected a national philanthropy. In January 2010, LTA became an official collegiate partner to St. Jude Children's Research Hospital, becoming the first individual Latino Greek organization to commit fully to the hospital's efforts.  LTA has pledged to bring awareness to childhood cancer, life-threatening diseases and St. Jude within the Latino community and to fundraise for the hospital through a variety of events and programs.
In 2014, the sorority expanded its partnership with St. Jude by becoming an official partner of the annual St. Jude Walk/Run to End Childhood Cancer, which brings communities together across the nation during Childhood Cancer Awareness Month to raise funds for the hospital. The sorority has repeatedly exceeded its sponsorship commitments and looks forward to this event every year.

Lambda Theta Alpha Foundation 

The Lambda Theta Alpha Foundation, Inc. was founded in 2015, based on the desires and needs identified by the National Board and Founding Mothers of Lambda Theta Alpha Latin Sorority, Inc. They identified the need to create a foundation where members and the community could contribute and benefit from its support. The mission is to promote the enrichment of our communities by providing funding for educational programming, collegiate scholarships, and spearheading humanitarian relief efforts. 

Merlix Reynolds, Carolina Sodre and Beatriz Barragan came together and on November 24, 2015, the Lambda Theta Alpha Foundation, Inc. (“the Foundation”) became a recognized corporation of the State of Oklahoma and was officially recognized as a 501c3 public charity by the IRS on July 14, 2016. Once established, the Foundation took time to develop its strategic planning and active board members. In 2017, Hurricane Harvey occurred, which ignited the need for support from the Foundation to support its community through its humanitarian relief pillar.

Since then, the Foundation has been upholding the mission of advancing the community through education, humanitarian relief and scholarship.

Chapter Philanthropies 
Most chapters of the organization have a chapter philanthropy in addition to the national philanthropy.  Completing a set number of community service hours at any organization for a good cause are required to join.

Chapters
Chapters and their founding years. The Alpha Alpha and Alpha Alpha Alpha series chapter names are designated for alumnae clubs.  Where known, the year when a chapter went dormant is noted. Active chapters noted in bold, inactive chapters noted in italics.

Alumnae chapters

Omega chapter
Omega chapter is dedicated to members of the sorority who are deceased. Historically, the sorority has honored these members with the title "Lambda Angels". During each national banquet a moment of silence is taken, and information about each member is incorporated into the program that reflects on each Lambda Angel’s accomplishments and the great loss that the Sisterhood has experienced, in their passing. In recent years a ceremony has been conducted at the national annual convention.

References

External links

National Association of Latino Fraternal Organizations
Latino fraternities and sororities
Student societies in the United States
Hispanic and Latino organizations
1975 establishments in New Jersey
Student organizations established in 1975